The Man with the Perfect Swing is a 1995 American comedy-drama movie written and directed by Michael Hovis.

Synopsis
A passion for golf drives this story about fame, schemes and paying the bills.  Having successfully failed at everything, Anthony "Babe" Lombardo rises from his couch potato life with one last hope.  He invents the perfect golf swing that he believes will revolutionize the game.  Determined to make it bankable, Babe frantically maneuvers amidst suspicious investors, vanishing friends and a disenchanted wife.

Awards
 1995 - Austin Film Festival - Best Film - Won

Cast
 Suzanne Savoy ...  Susan Lombardo
 James Belcher ...  Lou Gallo
 James Monroe Black ...  Anthony 'Babe' Lombardo (as James Black)
 Richard Bradshaw ...  Bonelli
 William Hardy ...  Scardino, Albert
 Marco Perella ...  Chuck Carter
 Harold Suggs ...  Father Mac
 Greg Norman ... Himself

Reviews
"A gem. The film has heart.", Louis B. Parks, The Houston Chronicle
"An endearing tale about chasing dreams. My film pick of the week.", David Davis, The L.A. Weekly
"Engaging comedy drama... Babe keeps the audience rooting.", Joe Leyden, Variety
"Considerable warmth, compassion and good humor", Kevin Thomas, Los Angeles Times

Video release
The film was released on video by Monarch Home Video in 1996.

External links
 The Man with the Perfect Swing @ IMDB

1995 films
Golf films
American sports comedy-drama films
1990s sports comedy-drama films
1990s English-language films
1990s American films